The Volkswagen Karmann Ghia is a sports car marketed in 2+2 coupe (1955–1974) and 2+2 convertible (1957–1974) body styles by Volkswagen. Internally designated the Type 14 (1955-1974) and Type 34 (1962-1969), the Karmann Ghia combined the chassis and mechanicals of the Type 1/Beetle and Type 3 and with styling by Italy's Carrozzeria Ghia and hand-built bodywork by German coachbuilding house Karmann.

For its final model year, the vestigial rear seat was discontinued for North American models, as it lacked provisions for seat belts; all Karmann Ghias for 1974 were marketed strictly as two-seaters. During 1962–1969, Volkswagen marketed the Type 34, based on the Type 3 platform, featuring angular bodywork and  mechanicals from said platform.

More than 445,000 Karmann Ghias were produced in Germany over the car's production life, not including the Type 34 variant. Volkswagen do Brasil (Volkswagen Brasil) produced 41,600 Type 34s in Brazil for South America between 1962 and 1975.

Long noted for its exterior styling, the Karmann Ghia was designed with input from numerous individuals at Carrozzeria Ghia and was strongly influenced by Virgil Exner's work, though all of its designers passed without a definitive individual styling attribution.

Genesis 
Three companies and numerous individuals came together in the history of the Karmann Ghia. In the early 1950s, Volkswagen was producing its Volkswagen Beetle, and as postwar standards of living increased, executives at Volkswagen were at least receptive to adding a halo model to its range, if not proactive.  Luigi Segre was committed to expanding the international reputation of Carrozzeria Ghia.  And Wilhelm Karmann had taken over his family coachbuilding firm Karmann and was eager to augment his contracts building Volkswagen's convertible models.

Wilhelm Karmann and Luigi Segre often encountered each other at international automobile shows, and after an initial discussion prompted by Wilhelm Karmann, Segre secretly obtained a Volkswagen Beetle to use as a basis for a prototype – the Type Is were difficult to come by and Gian Paolo, Mario Boano's son, purchased one in Paris and drove it back to Turin. Ghia customized its platform, designed the initial prototype and in five months constructed the model. Segre secretly presented the model to Wilhelm Karmann one year after the initial discussion — late in 1953, in Paris, at the Societé France Motors factories (Volkswagen's dealership for France and the exclusive European dealer of Ghia-built Chrysler models). When Wilhelm Karmann saw the coupe, Karmann said, "I'd like to build that!" As the head of Ghia, Segre singularly directed the project through conception and prototyping, delivering a feasible project that Willhelm Karmann both wanted to and could practically build — the project Willhelm Karmann would in turn present to Volkswagen.

The styling of the vehicle, however, integrated work by Segre as well as Mario Boano, Sergio Coggiola and  Giovanni Savonuzzi — and at various times they each took credit for the design. 
Furthermore, the design bore striking styling similarities to Virgil Exner's Chrysler d'Elegance and K-310 concepts, which Ghia had been tasked with prototyping — and which in turn reflected numerous cues and themes developed previously by Mario Boano. According to Virgil Exner's son, Virgil M. Exner Jr., Giovanni Savonuzzi was tasked with scaling down the full-sized d’Elegance, replacing "the Chrysler’s egg-crate grille with a gentle, boat-like prow. Exner Jr. is further quoted as saying that the Karmann Ghia “was a direct, intentional swipe off the Chrysler d’Elegance. Givanni Savonuzzi was the engineer and designer who downsized the d’Elegance and made the Karmann Ghia out of it. Nobody minded it. It was wonderful.”

The precise styling responsibilities were not well-documented at the time, before the passing of the various designers, further complicated by the overlapping work of the key players.  A definitive individual attribution on Karmann Ghia's styling was never made.

Segre and Virgil Exner became close professionally and personally, eventually traveling Europe together. Peter Grist wrote in his 2007 Exner biography that when Exner in 1955 eventually saw the Karmann Ghia, which cribbed heavily from his Chrysler d'Elegance, "he was pleased with the outcome and glad that one of his designs had made it into large-scale production.” Chris Voss, a stylist in Exner's office, reported in 1993, that Exner considered the Karmann Ghia the ultimate form of flattery. Segre in turn sent Exner the first production Karmann Ghia imported into the state of Michigan, in gratitude.

After Volkswagen approved the design in November 1953, the Karmann Ghia debuted (at the 1955 Paris and Frankfurt auto shows and at the Kasino Hotel in Westfalia, Germany, on July 14, 1955) and went into production, first at Ghia and then in Osnabrück — ultimately to reach a production over 445,000, running 19 years virtually unchanged.

Production
The design and prototype were well received by Volkswagen executives, and the Type 14 debuted at the October 1953 Paris Auto Show as a styling concept "by Ghia." In August 1955 the first Type 14 was manufactured in Osnabrück, Germany. Public reaction to the Type 14 exceeded expectations, and more than 10,000 were sold in the first year.

In contrast to the Beetle's machine-welded body with bolt-on fenders, the Karmann Ghia's body panels were butt-welded, hand-shaped, and smoothed with English pewter in a time-consuming process commensurate with higher-end manufacturers, resulting in the Karmann Ghia's higher price.

The Type 14 was marketed as a practical and stylish 2+2 rather than as a true sports car. As they shared engines, the Type 14's engine displacement grew concurrently with the Type 1 (Beetle), ultimately arriving at a displacement of 1584 cc, producing .

Production doubled soon after the Karmann Ghia's introduction, becoming the car most imported into the U.S.

In August 1957, Volkswagen introduced a convertible version of the Karmann Ghia. Exterior changes in 1961 included wider and finned front grilles, taller and more rounded rear taillights and headlights relocated to a higher position – with previous models and their lower headlight placement called lowlights. The Italian designer Sergio Sartorelli, designer of Type 34, oversaw the various restylings of Type 14.

In 1970, larger taillights integrated the reversing lights and larger wrap-around turn signals. Still larger and wider taillights increased side visibility. In 1972, large square-section bumpers replaced the smooth round originals, and tail lights were again enlarged. For the USA model only, 1973 modifications mandated by the National Highway Traffic Safety Administration (NHTSA) included energy-absorbing bumpers. A carpeted package shelf replaced the rear seat.

In late 1974 the car was superseded by the Golf-based Scirocco.

Type 34 Karmann Ghia 

In September 1961, Volkswagen introduced the VW 1500 Karmann Ghia, or Type 34, based on its new Type 3 platform, featuring Volkswagen's new flat 1500cc engine design, and styling by Italian engineer Sergio Sartorelli. Due to model confusion with the Type 14 1500 introduced in 1967, the Type 34 was known variously as the "Der Große Karmann" ("the big Karmann") in Germany, "Razor Edge Ghia" in the United Kingdom, or "European Ghia" (or "Type 3 Ghia" among enthusiasts) in the United States. Today the name Type 34 is recognized as the worldwide naming convention.

An electrically operated sliding steel sunroof was optional in 1962, the second automobile model in the world to have this option. The styling offered more interior and cargo room than the original Karmann Ghia. It featured an electric clock, three luggage spaces, built-in fog lights, round tail lights, upper and lower dash pads, door pads, and long padded armrests. It was the fastest production VW model of its day.

Until it was replaced by the VW-Porsche 914, it was the most expensive and luxurious passenger car VW manufactured in the 1960s — at the time costing twice as much as a Beetle in many markets. 42,505 (plus 17 prototype convertibles) were manufactured from 1962–1969.

Although the Type 34 was available in most countries, it was not offered officially in the U.S. – VW's largest and most important export market – another reason for its low sales numbers. Many still made their way to the USA (most via Canada), and the USA has the largest number of known Type 34s left in the world (400 of the total 1,500 to 2,000 or so remaining).

Like its Type 14 brother, the Type 34 was styled by the Italian design studio Ghia. There are some similar styling influences, but the Type 14 Ghia looks very different from the Type 34. The chassis is also a major difference between the cars; the Type 14 shares its chassis with a Beetle (though with wider floorpans), whereas the Type 34 body is mounted on the unmodified Type 3 chassis and drive train (the same as in a 1500/1600 Notchback, Variant (Squareback) and Fastback) – all distinguished by the standard 1500 pancake engine that allowed a front and rear boot. The Type 34 is mechanically the same as other Type 3s. All bodywork, interior, glass, bumpers, and most of the lenses are unique to the Type 34. With wider 6.00-15 crossply tyres until 1968 when they moved to 165R15 Pirelli Cinturato.

The Wilhelm Karmann factory assembly line which assembled the Type 34 also produced the VW-Porsche 914 (known as Porsche 914 in the USA), the Type 34's replacement.

Karmann Ghia TC 

As an alternative to the Type 34 Karmann-Ghia coupé, which Volkswagen had introduced to Europe in 1961, Volkswagen do Brasil looked to Ghia in Turin for a reworked version of the Type 14 at the end of the 1960s. At the time Ghia employed Giorgetto Giugiaro, the famous Italian designer and he was set to work on the new Brazilian Karmann Ghia. The result was the Volkswagen Karmann Ghia TC (Touring Coupé), internally known as the Type 145, which began production in 1972 and was produced until 1975.

This was a roomy 2+2 coupe with a modern and comfortable interior. Underneath, it was similar to the Type 14, although the platform of the Volkswagen Variant was used rather than that of the Volkswagen Beetle. The main difference was the engine: the Type 145 TC was fitted with the 1,584 cc flat-four air-cooled boxer unit from the Type 3 instead of the 1,192 cc unit of the Type 14.

18,119 TC models were produced during its production run from 1972 until 1975. It was offered only in South America and was not exported off the continent. There is a prototype that is part of the factory museum collection of Karmann in Osnabrück, Germany.

Subsequent concepts 
In 1990, Karmann introduced a Karmann Ghia-inspired concept car – the Karmann Coupe – at the Frankfurt Motor Show, and in April 2013 Karmann Ghia do Brasil launched a competition for Brazilian students to design a modern interpretation of the  classic Volkswagen Karmann-Ghia Coupé, possibly leading to the development of a prototype.

References

Notes

Bibliography

External links 

Tour of the Type 34
1974 Karmann Ghia Registry - https://docs.google.com/spreadsheets/d/1O4MQepBrAnwCKn9EXzSVPUmVA_oUOJU-WrmFUxON-qQ/edit#gid=0
TheSamba.com - great spot for KG info for hobbyists

Karmann Ghia
Rear-engined vehicles
Cars powered by rear-mounted 4-cylinder engines
Sports cars
Coupés
Convertibles
Cars powered by boxer engines
1960s cars
1970s cars
Karmann vehicles
Cars introduced in 1955